Sunrisers Hyderabad (often abbreviated as SRH) are a franchise cricket team based in Hyderabad, Telangana, which plays in the Indian Premier League (IPL). They are one of the ten teams to compete in the 2022 Indian Premier League, making their tenth appearance in all IPL tournaments.

Background
Trevor Bayliss and Brad Haddin stepped down as the head-coach and assistant coach of the Sunrisers Hyderabad following the last-place finish in the 2021 Indian Premier League. VVS Laxman stepped down as mentor to take the job as the Director of Cricket at the National Cricket Academy. On December 23, 2021, Tom Moody, predecessor to Bayliss, was announced as the head-coach of the Sunrisers Hyderabad with Simon Katich appointed as the assistant-coach. Dale Steyn, Brian Lara and Hemang Badani were also appointed as pace-bowling, batting and fielding coaches respectively. Katich left the team after the auction on 18 February 2022 citing bubble fatigue as the reason for his resignation. Sunrisers appointed Simon Helmot as their assistant coach for the IPL 2022. He previously worked under Moody as assistant coach for the Sunrisers between 2013 and 2019.

Player acquisition

In preparation for the 2022 mega-auction, the franchise retained three players and released 25 in November 2021. The auction took place on 12 and 13 February 2022 in Bangalore, with the team acquiring 20 players, almost exhausting their salary cap. Sunrisers released veterans David Warner and Rashid Khan, their highest run scorer and their second highest wicket taker respectively.

Players retained Kane Williamson, Abdul Samad, Umran Malik.
Players released David Warner, Manish Pandey, Jonny Bairstow, Wriddhiman Saha, Shreevats Goswami, Priyam Garg, Virat Singh, Rashid Khan, Vijay Shankar, Mohammad Nabi, Abhishek Sharma, Mitchell Marsh, Jason Holder, T. Natarajan, Bhuvneshwar Kumar, Shahbaz Nadeem, Khaleel Ahmed, Siddarth Kaul, Sandeep Sharma, Basil Thampi, Jagadeesha Suchith, Kedar Jadhav, Mujeeb Ur Rahman, Jason Roy, Sherfane Rutherford.
Players acquired Washington Sundar, Nicholas Pooran, T. Natarajan, Bhuvneshwar Kumar, Priyam Garg, Abhishek Sharma, Kartik Tyagi, Shreyas Gopal, Jagadeesha Suchith, Aiden Markram, Marco Jansen, Romario Shepherd, Sean Abbott, Ravikumar Samarth, Shashank Singh, Saurabh Dubey, Vishnu Vinod, Glenn Phillips, Fazalhaq Farooqi, Rahul Tripathi

Squad 
 Players with international caps are listed in bold.

 Year signed denotes the season the player was signed to the team

Administration and support staff

Kit manufacturers and sponsors
On 17 March Sunrisers released their kit including the sponsors list for the 2022 Indian Premier League.

Indian Premier League

A total of ten teams competed in the Indian Premier League in the 2022 season, an increase from eight in the previous season. The teams are divided into two groups of five with the teams being drawn according to the seedings based on their historic performance. Each team plays the other four teams in its own group twice, twice against the team in the same position in the opposite group, one game against each of the remaining teams in the opposite group. There is no relevant home-away formula as the matches are held in bio-secure bubbles across four venues, three in Mumbai and one in Pune, due to the ongoing pandemic. The four teams with the best overall record automatically qualifies for the playoffs.

The format for playoff stage remained same as the previous season where it was played according to the page playoff system and provided top two teams in the league stage with two ways of qualifying for the Final. The top two teams first faced each other in Qualifier 1, the winner of which qualified for the Final. The third and fourth placed teams in league stage faced each other in Eliminator. The loser of Qualifier 1 played against the winner of the Eliminator in Qualifier 2, the winner of which also qualified for the Final. The winner of Final was crowned as the IPL champions.

Offseason
The fixtures for this season were released on 6 March with the Sunrisers Hyderabad playing their first match against the Rajasthan Royals on 29 March at Maharashtra Cricket Association Stadium in Pune.

Season overview

League stage 
Standings

Results by match

Fixtures

League stage

Statistics

Awards and achievements

Awards
Man of the Match

Achievements
 Emerging player of the 2022 IPL : Umran Malik
 Highest strike rate in an innings in the 2022 IPL : Shashank Singh (416.66)

Reaction
The Sunrisers coach Tom Moody said the team lost their winning momentum due to the injuries to their key players, Washington Sundar and T. Natarajan while praising the uncapped Indian trio of Umran Malik, Abhishek Sharma and Rahul Tripathi for their outstanding season. Moody said, “Overall, we are excited with the squad we have got. However, we will make certain adjustments to be stronger in 2023.”

On September 2, Moody parted ways with the team with the current batting coach, Brian Lara, taking over as the head-coach for the 2023 IPL season.

Notes

Footnotes

References

External links
Sunrisers Hyderabad official website

2022 Indian Premier League
Sunrisers Hyderabad seasons